This is a list of American television programs currently in production.

1940s

1947
 Meet the Press

1948
 CBS Evening News

1949
Thoroughbred Racing on NBC

1950s

1951
 Hallmark Hall of Fame
 PGA Tour on CBS

1952
 American Religious Townhall
 Today

1953
 ABC World News Tonight

1954
 Face the Nation
 Golf Channel on NBC
 The Tonight Show

1955
 Tennis on NBC

1956
 The Open Mind

1958
 College Football on CBS Sports

1960s

1960
 CBS Sports Spectacular

1963
 General Hospital

1965
 Days of Our Lives

1966
 The 700 Club
 ESPN College Football on ABC (1950, 1952, 1954-1956, 1960-1961, 1966–present)

1967
 Washington Week

1968
 60 Minutes

1969
 Sesame Street

1970s

1970
 Monday Night Football
 NBC Nightly News

1971
 Masterpiece

1972
 Great Performances 
 The Price Is Right

1973
 Praise
 The Young and the Restless

1974
 Nova

1975
 Good Morning America
 PBS NewsHour
 Saturday Night Live
 U.S. Farm Report
 Wheel of Fortune

1976
 Austin City Limits
 Live from Lincoln Center
 Star Gazers

1977
 Inside the NFL

1978
 20/20

1979
 CBS News Sunday Morning
 ESPN College Basketball
 Golf on ESPN
 SportsCenter
 This Old House

1980s

1980
 Nightline

1981

 College Basketball on CBS
 Entertainment Tonight
 MotorWeek
 This Week

1982

 AgDay
 America This Morning
 CBS Morning News (1963–1979, 1982–present)
 Late Night
 Nature

1983

 Frontline
 Live with...

1984

 ESPN College Football Saturday Primetime
 Jeopardy! (1964–1975, 1978–1979, 1984–present)

1985

 National Geographic Explorer
 Sunday NFL Countdown

1986

 American Masters
 Noticiero Univision
 Showtime Championship Boxing

1987

 Big Monday
 The Bold and the Beautiful
 College GameDay, football version
 NFL Primetime
 Noticias Telemundo
 Weekend Today

1988

 American Experience
 48 Hours
 POV

1989

 America's Funniest Home Videos
 Cops
 Inside Edition
 Inside the NBA 
 NBA on TNT
 MTV Unplugged
 The Simpsons

1990s

1990

 Baseball Tonight
 ESPN Major League Baseball
 NBA Action
 Sunday Night Baseball

1991

 E! News
 Notre Dame Football on NBC

1992

 Dateline NBC
 ESPN College Football Thursday Primetime
 To the Contrary
 World News Now

1993

 Enjoying Everyday Life
 Entertainers with Byron Allen
 The Late Show
 Monday Night Countdown
 NFL Matchup
 Power Rangers
 Super Tuesday
 WWE Raw

1994

 Extra
 NFL on Fox
 Fox NFL Sunday
 Inside the Actors Studio
 Primer Impacto

1995

 Boxing on Fox
 Fox College Hoops
 Golf Central
 The Late Late Show
 Real Sports with Bryant Gumbel
 Squawk Box
 Washington Journal

1996

 Access Hollywood
 The Daily Show
 Fox News Sunday
 Major League Baseball Game of the Week (1953–1993, 1996–present)
 Major League Baseball on Fox
 MSNBC Reports
 Power Lunch
 Your World with Neil Cavuto

1997

 Antiques Roadshow
 ¡Despierta América!
 The People's Court (1981–1993, 1997–present)
 South Park
 The View
 WNBA on ESPN

1998

 Aquí y Ahora
 Book TV
 The Challenge
 El Gordo y la Flaca
 Fox & Friends
 NFL on CBS (1956–1994, 1998–present)
 NFL Live
 The NFL Today (1961–1994, 1998–present)
 Special Report

1999

 Divorce Court (1957–1962, 1967–1969, 1985–1992, 1999–present)
 Early Today
 Family Feud (1976–1985, 1988–1995, 1999–present)
 Fox College Football
 Fox Report
 Hardwood Classics
 House Hunters
 Independent Lens
 Judge Mathis
 Law & Order: Special Victims Unit
 República Deportiva
 SpongeBob SquarePants
 WWE SmackDown

2000s

2000

 America's Morning Headquarters
 Andrea Mitchell Reports
 Big Brother
 Closer to Truth
 Contacto Deportivo
 Curb Your Enthusiasm
 In Depth
 Secrets of the Dead
 Survivor
 Travels & Traditions

2001

 The Amazing Race
 America's Test Kitchen
 Art:21
 College Football Scoreboard
 The Essentials
 Hard Knocks
 NASCAR on Fox
 NASCAR RaceDay
 Pardon the Interruption

2002

 Al Rojo Vivo
 Around the Horn
 The Bachelor
 Barefoot Contessa
 Closing Bell
 CMT Crossroads
 CNN Business Traveller
 Cyberchase
 Dr. Phil
 NBA Countdown
 NBA on ABC (1965–1973, 2002–present)
 NBA on ESPN (1982–1984, 2002–present)

2003

 Anderson Cooper 360°
 Jimmy Kimmel Live!
 Missing
 NCIS
 NFL Total Access
 ¿Quien Tiene La Razon?
 Real Time with Bill Maher
 Thursday Night Showcase

2004

 Casos de Familia
 ESPN2 College Football Friday Primetime
 The First 48
 Impact!
 Journal Editorial Report
 Project Runway
 Q&A
 Snapped

2005

 After Words
 America's Heartland 
 American Dad!
 College GameDay, basketball version 
 Criminal Minds
 Dancing with the Stars
 Deadliest Catch
 Deadly Women 
 Family Guy (1999–2003, 2005–present)
 Grey's Anatomy 
 Hell's Kitchen
 Intervention
 It's Always Sunny in Philadelphia 
 Mad Money
 Made in Hollywood
 Puppy Bowl
 Robot Chicken
 Saturday Primetime 
 The Situation Room with Wolf Blitzer
 So You Think You Can Dance
 Squawk on the Street
 Worldwide Exchange

2006

 America's Game: The Super Bowl Champions
 America's Got Talent 
 CNN Newsroom
 College Football on NBC Sports
 Curious George
 Diners, Drive-Ins and Dives 
 Fast Money
 Football Night in America 
 Million Dollar Listing Los Angeles
 NBC Sunday Night Football
 NFL GameDay
 NFL on NBC (1955–1998, 2006–present) 
 NFL Replay
 Rachael Ray
 The Real Housewives of Orange County
 Saturday Night Football
 Thursday Night Football
 Top Chef

2007

 Al Punto 
 American Greed 
 America's Newsroom
 AXS TV Fights
 BBC World News America
 College Football Live
 E:60
 First Take
 Major League Baseball on TBS 
 Morning Joe
 NFL Top 10
 Nuestra Belleza Latina
 Say Yes to the Dress
 The Steve Wilkos Show
 TMZ on TV

2008

 1st Look
 The Bachelorette (2003–2005, 2008–present)
 Fareed Zakaria GPS
 Ghost Adventures
 NBA Gametime Live 
 The Rachel Maddow Show 
 The Real Housewives of Atlanta 
 The Real Housewives of New York City
 Today with Hoda & Jenna
 Unsung

2009

 30 for 30
 American Ninja Warrior
 Archer
 Chopped
 CNN Newsroom
 The Glenn Beck Program (2006–2008, 2009–present)
 Hannity 
 Hot Stove
 IndyCar Series on NBC
 Let's Make a Deal (1963–1977, 1980–1981, 1984–1986, 1990–1991, 2003, 2009–present)
 MLB Network Showcase
 MLB Tonight
 NASCAR Race Hub 
 NBA Sunday Showcase
 NCIS: Los Angeles 
 On the Case with Paula Zahn 
 Pawn Stars 
 Pit Bulls & Parolees
 Quick Pitch
 The Real Housewives of New Jersey
 RuPaul's Drag Race
 Shark Tank
 State of the Union with Jake Tapper
 Thursday Night Baseball (1979–1983, 1989, 1997–2001, 2003–2006, 2009–present)
 Watch What Happens Live with Andy Cohen

2010s

2010

 America's Court with Judge Ross
 American Pickers
 Ancient Aliens
 Blue Bloods
 Gold Rush
 The Great Food Truck Race
 How the Universe Works
 The Last Word with Lawrence O'Donnell
 MasterChef
 The Real Housewives of Beverly Hills
 RuPaul's Drag Race: Untucked
 Sister Wives
 Storage Wars
 Swamp People
 The Talk
 Undercover Boss
 Worst Cooks in America
 WWE NXT

2011

 Alaska: The Last Frontier
 Alex Witt Reports
 American Horror Story
 Bluegrass Underground
 Bob's Burgers
 Brain Games
 The Dead Files
 Dish Nation
 Elizabeth Stanton's Great Big World
 Erin Burnett OutFront
 The Five
 Halloween Wars
 Impractical Jokers
 The Incredible Dr. Pol
 Intentional Talk
 La Reina del Sur
 Moonshiners
 NCAA March Madness
 NFL Top 100
 NHL Tonight
 Off the Air
 Penn & Teller: Fool Us
 The Pioneer Woman
 PoliticsNation with Al Sharpton
 Ridiculousness
 Shaqtin' a Fool
 Super Soul Sunday
 Talking Dead
 The Voice
 Wild Kratts

2012

 Amanpour (2009–2010, 2012–present)
 Baseball Night in America
 Bering Sea Gold
 Catfish: The TV Show
 Chicago Fire
 Daniel Tiger's Neighborhood
 Early Start
 The Eric Andre Show
 Finding Your Roots
 Fox & Friends First
 Graveyard Carz
 Justice for All with Judge Cristina Perez
 Love & Hip Hop: Atlanta
 MeatEater
 Mountain Men
 My 600-lb Life
 RuPaul's Drag Race All Stars
 Small Town Big Deal
 Trisha's Southern Kitchen
 UFC Ultimate Insider
 Varney & Co.
 Wicked Tuna
 WWE Main Event

2013

 All In with Chris Hayes
 Barnwood Builders
 Beat Bobby Flay
 Below Deck
 Black Ink Crew
 The Blacklist
 Celebrity Page
 El Señor de los Cielos
 Fatal Attraction
 Fox NFL Kickoff
 The Goldbergs
 The Great Christmas Light Fight
 Guy's Grocery Games
 The Lead with Jake Tapper
 Life Below Zero
 Little Britches Rodeo
 Little People, Big World (2006–2010, 2013–present)
 Marriage Boot Camp
 Married to Medicine
 MasterChef Junior
 Media Buzz
 Naked and Afraid
 Nick Cannon Presents: Wild 'N Out (2005–2007, 2013–present)
 PAW Patrol
 Premier League on NBC
 Rick and Morty
 Snapped: Killer Couples
 Street Outlaws
 Teen Titans Go!
 Vanderpump Rules
 Vice
 Whose Line Is It Anyway? (1998–2007, 2013–present)

2014

 90 Day Fiancé
 Alaskan Bush People
 Bachelor in Paradise
 Back of the Shop
 Blaze and the Monster Machines
 Botched
 The Carbonaro Effect
 Chicago P.D.
 Chrisley Knows Best
 The Curse of Oak Island
 Dr. Oakley, Yukon Vet
 ESPN Megacast (2006–2007, 2014–present)
 Fargo
 Fear Thy Neighbor
 The Flash
 Holiday Baking Championship
 Hot Bench
 Inside Politics (1984–2005, 2014–present)
 The Kitchen
 Last Week Tonight with John Oliver
 Married at First Sight
 Masters of Illusion (2000–2001, 2009, 2014–present)
 MLB Whiparound
 Outlander
 Outnumbered
 Return to Amish
 Running Wild with Bear Grylls
 SEC Nation
 Soccer on Fox Sports
 Southern Charm
 When Calls the Heart
 Wicked Tuna: Outer Banks

2015

 7 Little Johnstons
 Alone
 Alvin and the Chipmunks
 Bunk'd
 CBS Overnight News
 Celebrity Family Feud (2008, 2015–present)
 Chef's Table
 Chicago Med
 Documentary Now!
 Expedition Unknown
 Fear the Walking Dead
 Forged in Fire
 Full Measure with Sharyl Attkisson
 Gutfeld!
 Halloween Baking Championship
 I Am Jazz
 Kids Baking Championship
 Matter of Fact with Soledad O'Brien
 My Big Fat Fabulous Life
 My Lottery Dream Home
 Naked and Afraid XL
 NASCAR on NBC (1979–1981, 1983–1985, 1999–2006, 2015–present)
 Nature Cat
 Premier Boxing Champions
 Soccer on Fox Sports
 Spring Baking Championship
 Valerie's Home Cooking
 What on Earth?

2016

 The 11th Hour
 All or Nothing
 American Crime Story
 Below Deck Mediterranean
 Billions
 The Circus: Inside the Greatest Political Show on Earth
 The Crown
 Evil Lives Here
 The Girlfriend Experience
 Good Bones
 Good Morning Football
 Home Town
 Kindred Spirits
 Lone Star Law
 The Loud House
 NBA Saturday Primetime on ABC
 Pyramid (1973–1988, 1991, 2002–2004, 2012, 2016–present)
 The Real Housewives of Potomac
 Skip and Shannon: Undisputed
 Slasher
 Speak for Yourself with Cowherd & Whitlock
 Stranger Things
 To Tell the Truth (1956–1968, 1969–1978, 1980–1981, 1990–1991, 2000–2002, 2016–present)
 Tucker Carlson Tonight
 United Shades of America
 Vice News Tonight
 The Wall

2017

 Basketball Wives (2010–2013, 2017–present)
 Beat Shazam
 The Beat with Ari Melber
 Best Baker in America
 Big Mouth
 Cold Justice (2013–2015, 2017–present)
 Deadline: White House
 First Things First
 Fox News @ Night
 Funny You Should Ask
 Genius
 The Good Doctor
 The Handmaid's Tale
 Huckabee (2008–2015, 2017–present)
 The Ingraham Angle
 Maine Cabin Masters
 Man v. Food (2008–2012, 2017–present)
 The Marvelous Mrs. Maisel
 Mira quién baila (2010–2013, 2017–present)
 The Next Revolution
 NFL on Prime Video
 The Orville
 Puppy Dog Pals
 Raven's Home
 Riverdale
 SEAL Team
 Siesta Key
 Snowfall
 Star Trek: Discovery
 Steve
 The Story with Martha MacCallum
 Summer House
 S.W.A.T.
 Tales
 Young Sheldon

2018

 25 Words or Less
 9-1-1
 All American
 Amanpour & Company
 America Says
 American Idol (2002–2016, 2018–present)
 ATL Homicide
 Barry
 BattleBots (2000-2002, 2015-2016, 2018-present)
 Big City Greens
 Cavuto Live
 The Chi
 Cobra Kai
 Condor
 The Conners
 Craig of the Creek
 Crikey! It's the Irwins
 Dr. Pimple Popper
 The Dragon Prince
 Ex on the Beach
 Extinct or Alive
 The Family Business
 FBI
 Firing Line (1966–1999, 2018–present)
 Flip or Flop Nashville
 Get Up!
 Girl Meets Farm
 GMA3: What You Need To Know
 Gold Rush: White Water
 Grown-ish
 Hilda
 Jersey Shore: Family Vacation
 The Last Drive-in with Joe Bob Briggs
 Life, Liberty & Levin
 Love & Hip Hop: Miami
 Love After Lockup
 Magnum P.I.
 Manifest
 Mayans M.C.
 A Million Little Things
 Miz & Mrs.
 More in Common
 My Next Guest Needs No Introduction with David Letterman
 Nailed It!
 The Neighborhood
 PBA on Fox
 Pinkalicious & Peterrific
 Queer Eye
 Rainbow Rangers
 Random Acts of Flyness
 Red Table Talk
 The Resident
 The Rookie
 The Shop
 Somebody Feed Phil
 Station 19
 Succession
 Summer Camp Island
 Teen Mom: Young and Pregnant
 Titans
 Tom Clancy's Jack Ryan
 Unprotected Sets
 Yellowstone
 You

2019

 All Elite Wrestling: Dynamite
 All Rise
 Are You Afraid of the Dark? (1992-1996, 1999-2000, 2019-present)
 Big Noon Kickoff
 A Black Lady Sketch Show
 Blue's Clues & You!
 Bob Hearts Abishola
 The Boys
 Bubble Guppies (2011–2016, 2019–present)
 Cake
 Care Bears: Unlock the Magic
 Couples Therapy
 Court Cam
 Crank Yankers (2002–2007, 2019–present)
 Creepshow
 David Makes Man
 Delicious Miss Brown
 Doom Patrol
 Euphoria
 Evil
 The Family Chantel
 First Wives Club
 For All Mankind
 Formula 1: Drive to Survive
 Ghost Hunters (2004–2016, 2019–present)
 Ghostwriter
 Godfather of Harlem
 Good Trouble
 Good Omens
 Gordon Ramsay: Uncharted
 Harley Quinn
 Helpsters
 High School Musical: The Musical: The Series
 Holey Moley
 The Hot Zone
 I Think You Should Leave with Tim Robinson
 The Kelly Clarkson Show
 The L Word: Generation Q
 Live Rescue
 Live Rescue: Rewind
 Love, Death & Robots
 Love Island
 The Mandalorian
 Marrying Millions
 The Masked Singer
 Master Minds
 Miracle Workers
 Molly of Denali
 The Morning Show
 Mountain Monsters (2013–2017, 2019–present)
 Mysteries Decoded
 Nancy Drew
 The New York Times Presents
 The Other Two
 The Oval
 Press Your Luck (1983–1986, 2019–present)
 Primal
 Ramy
 The Ready Room
 Restaurant: Impossible (2011–2016, 2019–present)
 The Righteous Gemstones
 Russian Doll
 Selling Sunset
 Sherman's Showcase
 Sistas
 Straight Up Steve Austin
 Supermarket Stakeout
 Tacoma FD
 Tamron Hall
 Temptation Island (2001–2003, 2019–present)
 Truth Be Told
 Two Sentence Horror Stories
 The Umbrella Academy
 Undone
 Virgin River
 Warrior
 What We Do in the Shadows
 When Hope Calls
 The Witcher
 The World According to Jeff Goldblum
 Wu-Tang: An American Saga
 Yum and Yummer

2020s

2020

 9-1-1: Lone Star
 16 and Pregnant (2009–2014, 2020–present)
 1000-lb Sisters
 The Amber Ruffin Show
 America Reports
 The American Barbecue Showdown
 Amy Schumer Learns to Cook
 Awkwafina is Nora from Queens
 Baby Shark's Big Show!
 Below Deck Sailing Yacht
 Big Sky
 Blood of Zeus
 Breeders
 Bridgerton
 Bruh
 Central Park
 Cherish the Day
 Chrissy's Court
 The Circle
 The Con
 Cursed Films
 Danger Force
 Darcey & Stacey
 Dave
 Dear...
 Deliciousness
 DeMarcus Family Rules
 Dicktown
 Doug Unplugs
 Down to Earth with Zac Efron
 Dream Home Makeover
 The Drew Barrymore Show
 Elinor Wonders Why
 Emily in Paris
 Family Karma
 The FBI Declassified
 FBI: Most Wanted
 Floor Is Lava
 Forensic Files II
 Go! Go! Cory Carson
 The Great
 The Greatest AtHome Videos
 Greatness Code
 Hightown
 History 101
 Home
 Home Before Dark
 House of Ho
 How To with John Wilson
 I Can See Your Voice
 Joseline's Cabaret
 Lego Masters
 Little America
 Looney Tunes Cartoons
 Love Is Blind
 Making the Cut
 Million Dollar Beach House
 Monsterland
 Mythic Quest
 Never Have I Ever
 NewsNation Prime
 Next in Fashion
 The Oprah Conversation
 Outer Banks
 The Owl House
 P-Valley
 Perry Mason
 Power Book II: Ghost
 Ratched
 The Real Housewives of Salt Lake City
 Ruthless
 Santiago of the Seas
 Selena + Chef
 Sell This House (2003–2011, 2020–present)
 Short Circuit
 Solar Opposites
 Star Trek: Lower Decks
 Star Trek: Picard
 Stillwater
 Sweet Magnolias
 Ted Lasso
 Too Hot to Handle
 Tooning Out the News
 Tough as Nails
 Trying
 Tu cara me suena
 Tyler Perry's Assisted Living
 Tyler Perry's House of Payne (2006–2012, 2020–present)
 Tyler Perry's Young Dylan
 Unsolved Mysteries (1987–1999, 2001–2002, 2008–2010, 2020–present)
 Upload
 Velshi
 Waka & Tammy: What The Flocka
 Way Too Early with Jonathan Lemire (2009–2016, 2020–present)
 Weakest Link (2001–2003, 2020–present)
 We're Here
 While the Rest of Us Die: Secrets of America's Shadow Government
 The Wonderful World of Mickey Mouse
 World's Funniest Animals
 YOLO: Crystal Fantasy
 Your Honor

2021

 100 Foot Wave
 Abbott Elementary
 Acapulco
 Adorableness
 AEW Rampage
 Alma's Way
 America's Big Deal
 America's Black Forum (1977-2006, 2021-present)
 America's Funniest Home Videos: Animal Edition
 American Auto
 American Horror Stories
 American Justice (1992-2005, 2021-present)
 American Rust
 And Just Like That...
 Arcane
 Así se baila
 Bake Squad
 Baking It
 Banfield
 Behind the Attraction
 Belle Collective
 Big Trick Energy
 Billy the Kid
 Birdgirl
 Blindspotting
 Bling Empire
 BMF
 Buried by the Bernards
 Call Me Kat
 Catching Killers
 CBS Mornings
 Chain Reaction (1980, 1986–1991, 2006–2007, 2015–2016, 2021-present)
 The Challenge: All Stars
 Chapelwaite
 The Chase (2013–2015, 2021-present)
 Chicago Party Aunt
 The Chicken Squad
 Chip 'n' Dale: Park Life
 Chucky
 City Confidential (1998-2005, 2021-present)
 CNN Tonight (2009-2010, 2021-present)
 Cold Case Files (1999-2002, 2005-2006, 2017, 2021-present)
 College Bowl (1959-1970, 1979-1982, 1987, 2021-present)
 Cribs (2000-2011, 2021-present)
 Crime Scene Kitchen
 The Croods: Family Tree
 Cruel Summer
 CSI: Vegas
 The D'Amelio Show
 Days of Our Lives: Beyond Salem
 Dogs in Space
 Donkey Hodie
 Doogie Kameāloha, M.D.
 Dota: Dragon's Blood
 Dr. Death
 DreamWorks Dragons: The Nine Realms
 The Equalizer
 Fairfax
 Fantasy Island
 Fast Foodies
 The Faulkner Focus
 FBI: International
 Firefly Lane
 Foundation
 Fox News Live (1999-2008, 2021-present)
 Gabby's Dollhouse
 The Game
 The Ghost and Molly McGee
 Ghosts
 Ginny & Georgia
 Girls5eva
 Go, Dog. Go!
 Go-Big Show
 Grand Crew
 The Great North
 Hacks
 Harlem
 Harriet the Spy
 He-Man and the Masters of the Universe
 Heels
 High on the Hog: How African American Cuisine Transformed America
 Hit-Monkey
 Home Economics
 HouseBroken
 Hoy Día
 iCarly
 Invasion
 Invincible
 Jellystone!
 Judy Justice
 Kamp Koral: SpongeBob's Under Years
 Kung Fu
 La Brea
 La casa de los famosos
 Launchpad
 Law & Order: Organized Crime
 Leverage: Redemption
 Loki
 Lucas the Spider
 Manningcast
 Marvel Studios: Assembled
 Marvel Studios: Legends
 Mayor of Kingstown
 Messyness
 Mickey Mouse Funhouse
 Middlemost Post
 Modern Marvels (1992–2015, 2021-present)
 Monsters at Work
 The Ms. Pat Show
 My Unorthodox Life
 Name That Tune (1953–1959, 1970–1971, 1974–1981, 1984–1985, 2021-present)
 The National Desk
 Nature Gone Wild
 NBA Today
 NCIS: Hawaiʻi
 NHL on ABC (1993-1994, 2000-2004, 2021-present)
 NHL on ESPN (1979-1982, 1985-1988, 1992-2004, 2021-present)
 NHL on TNT
 Nightwatch (2015-2017, 2021-present)
 Only Murders in the Building
 Painting with John
 Por amor o por dinero
 The Patrick Star Show
 People Puzzler
 Physical
 Power Book III: Raising Kanan
 The Premise
 The Problem with Jon Stewart
 Queen of the Universe
 The Real Housewives of Miami (2011-2013, 2021-present)
 The Real Housewives Ultimate Girls Trip
 Reservation Dogs
 Resident Alien
 Rugrats
 Run the World
 Schmigadoon!
 Secret Celebrity Renovation
 Secrets of Sulphur Springs
 Sex/Life
 The Sex Lives of College Girls
 Shadow and Bone
 Sharkdog
 Shipping Wars (2012-2015, 2021-present)
 The Snoopy Show
 Solos
 Spidey and His Amazing Friends
 Star Trek: Prodigy
 Star Wars: The Bad Batch
 Star Wars: Visions
 Superhero Kindergarten
 Superman & Lois
 Superstar
 Swagger
 Sweet Tooth
 Tampa Baes
 TechCheck
 Teenage Euthanasia
 Tell Me Your Secrets
 Ten Year Old Tom
 Tha God's Honest Truth
 That Damn Michael Che
 That Girl Lay Lay
 That's My Jam
 Them
 This Just In with Max Kellerman
 Thomas & Friends: All Engines Go
 Toon In with Me
 Tooned In
 Top Gear America (2017, 2021-present)
 Tug of Words
 The Upshaws
 Walker
 What If...?
 The Wheel of Time
 The White Lotus
 Wipeout
 With Love
 Wolfboy and the Everything Factory
 The Wonder Years
 WWE's Most Wanted Treasures
 Yellowjackets
 You Bet Your Life (1950-1961, 1980-1981, 1992-1993, 2021-present)
 Young Rock
 Ziwe

2022

 1923
 Action Pack
 The Afterparty
 Alex Wagner Tonight
 Alice's Wonderland Bakery
 All American: Homecoming
 All Star Shore
 Amber Brown
 America's Got Talent: Extreme
 American Song Contest
 Andor
 Angry Birds: Summer Madness
 Barbie: It Takes Two
 Barmageddon
 Batwheels
 Baymax!
 The Bear
 Beavis and Butt-Head (1993-1997, 2011, 2022-present)
 Becoming A Popstar
 Bee and Puppycat (2013-2016, 2022-present)
 Bel-Air
 Below Deck Adventure
 The Big Brunch
 Big Nate
 Bosch: Legacy
 The Boulet Brothers' Dragula: Titans
 The Boys Presents: Diabolical
 Bugs Bunny Builders
 Bust Down
 The Calling
 Cars on the Road
 Celebrity Big Brother (2018-2019, 2022-present)
 The Challenge: USA
 Chibiverse
 Claim to Fame
 The Cleaning Lady
 CNN This Morning
 College Hill: Celebrity Edition
 Come Dance with Me
 The Courtship
 The Creature Cases
 Criss Angel's Magic With the Stars
 The Cuphead Show!
 Dancing with Myself
 Daniel Spellbound
 Dark Winds
 Dirty Jobs (2003-2012, 2020, 2022-present)
 Domino Masters
 Don't Forget the Lyrics! (2007-2011, 2022-present)
 Doomlands
 East New York
 Echo 3
 Eureka!
 Face's Music Party
 Farzar
 The Final Straw
 Fire Country
 Firebuds
 Fraggle Rock: Back to the Rock
 Friday Night Baseball
 From
 Generation Gap
 The Gilded Age
 God's Favorite Idiot
 The Guardians of Justice
 Guillermo del Toro's Cabinet of Curiosities
 Halo
 Hamster & Gretel
 High School
 House of the Dragon
 How I Met Your Father
 Human Resources
 Hype House
 I Am Groot
 I Love That for You
 In From the Cold
 Ink Master (2012-2020, 2022-present)
 Inside Amy Schumer (2013-2016, 2022-present)
 Interview with the Vampire
 Iron Chef: Quest for an Iron Legend
 Is It Cake?
 The Jennifer Hudson Show
 Jeopardy! National College Championship
 Joe Millionaire (2003, 2022-present)
 Judge Steve Harvey
 Julia
 Kandi & The Gang
 The Kardashians
 Killing It
 Kingdom Business
 The Kings of Napa
 Kung Fu Panda: The Dragon Knight
 Law & Order (1990-2010, 2022-present)
 A League of Their Own
 The Legend of Vox Machina
 Life & Beth
 The Lincoln Lawyer
 Little Demon
 Loot
 Lopez vs Lopez
 The Lord of the Rings: The Rings of Power
 Major League Baseball on NBC (1947-1989, 1994-2000, 2022-present)
 Mecha Builders
 MLB Sunday Leadoff
 The Mole (2001-2008, 2022-present)
 Monster High
 Murderville
 My Little Pony: Make Your Mark
 Mystery Science Theater 3000 (1988-1999, 2017-2018, 2022-present)
 National Treasure: Edge of History
 NBC News Daily
 Next Level Chef
 The Old Man
 On Patrol: Live
 Our Flag Means Death
 Outer Range
 Pachinko
 Password (1961-1967, 1971-1975, 2022-present)
 Peacemaker
 The Peripheral
 Pieces of Her
 Pinecone & Pony
 Pitch Perfect: Bumper in Berlin
 Power Book IV: Force
 Pretty Little Liars: Original Sin
 The Proud Family: Louder and Prouder
 Quantum Leap
 The Quest
 Rap Sh!t
 Reacher
 The Real Housewives of Dubai
 Real Husbands of Hollywood (2013-2016, 2022-present)
 The Real Love Boat
 The Really Loud House
 Reasonable Doubt
 The Recruit
 The Rehearsal
 Reno 911! (2003-2009, 2020, 2022-present)
 The Resort
 Ring Nation
 Roar
 The Rookie: Feds
 Rosie's Rules
 Samurai Rabbit: The Usagi Chronicles
 The Sandman
 The Santa Clauses
 Selling the OC
 The Serpent Queen
 Severance
 Shining Girls
 Shining Vale
 Single Drunk Female
 Smiling Friends
 Snake in the Grass
 So Help Me Todd
 Somebody Somewhere
 Sonic Prime
 Spirit Rangers
 Sprung
 Star Trek: Strange New Worlds
 The Summer I Turned Pretty
 Super Giant Robot Brothers
 Super Pumped
 Surfside Girls
 The Surreal Life (2003-2006, 2022-present)
 Swimming with Sharks
 Take Out with Lisa Ling
 Tales of the Jedi
 Tales of the Walking Dead
 Team Zenko Go
 Teen Mom: Family Reunion
 Tell Me Lies
 The Terminal List
 This Fool
 Three Pines
 Tokyo Vice
 Transformers: BotBots
 Transformers: EarthSpark
 Tulsa King
 The Ultimatum: Marry or Move On
 Vikings: Valhalla
 The Villains of Valley View
 Walker: Independence
 The Watcher
 We Baby Bears
 Wednesday
 Welcome to Flatch
 Welcome to Wrexham
 Who Do You Believe?
 Who Do You Think You Are? (2010-2018, 2022-present)
 The Winchesters
 Winning Time: The Rise of the Lakers Dynasty
 Would I Lie to You?
 WWE NXT Level Up
 WWE Rivals
 Yo! MTV Raps (1988-1995, 2022-present)
 Zatima
 Zootopia+

2023

 Accused
 Alert: Missing Persons Unit
 America in Black
 America's Got Talent: All-Stars
 Animal Control
 Are You the One? (2014-2019, 2023)
 The Ark
 The Company You Keep
 The Consultant
 Dear Edward
 Extrapolations
 Farmer Wants a Wife (2008, 2023)
 Freeridge
 Gotham Knights
 Hello Tomorrow!
 Kiff
 Koala Man
 The Last of Us
 Lingo (1987-1988, 2002-2007, 2011, 2023)
 Mayfair Witches
 MILF Manor
 Moon Girl and Devil Dinosaur
 My Dad the Bounty Hunter
 Night Court
 Not Dead Yet
 Outlast
 Party Down (2009-2010, 2023)
 Perfect Match
 Poker Face
 Power Slap
 The Real Friends of WeHo
 The Reluctant Traveler
 Shape Island
 Shrinking
 SuperKitties
 Swarm
 That '90s Show
 The Traitors
 True Lies
 Unprisoned
 Velma
 The Watchful Eye
 Will Trent
 Wolf Pack
 Work It Out Wombats!

References

Production
Television shows currently in production
20th century-related lists
21st century-related lists